Penlee Point (meaning ‘stone-slab headland’) is a coastal headland to the southeast of the village of Rame in southeast Cornwall, UK. The point lies at the entrance to Plymouth Sound.

Historical locations
Above the point, a little below the Coastal Path, is Queen Adelaide's Grotto, built in 1827/1828 to commemorate the visit of King William IV and Queen Adelaide to Mount Edgcumbe.  Penlee Battery is the former site of a fort, and is now a nature reserve.

See also

 Penlee Point, Mousehole

References

Headlands of Cornwall